Eubria palustris is a species of beetle belonging to the family Psephenidae.

It is native to Europe.

Synonyms:
 Cyphon palustris Germar, 1818
 Eubria marchantiae Jacquelin du Val, 1854

References

Byrrhoidea
Beetles described in 1818
Beetles of Europe